Future Minds Organised by the Junior Old Boys association of Nalanda College Colombo in collaboration with Government of Sri Lanka is an annual three-day Educational and Career Guidance Exhibition in Sri Lanka held annually at BMICH, Colombo. Kandy City Centre and Galle Municipal Council host secondary exhibitions for the same following the primary one in Colombo.

Recognition and patronage

This exhibition is patronaged by the Office of the President of Sri Lanka and is endorsed by the Ministries of Education,
Vocational & Technical Training, Mass Media & Information and Posts and Telecommunication.

History and Objective

Initially started as a job bank and career guidance program  for senior students of Nalanda College Colombo in early 2000. Lately in 2006 expanded and was named Future Minds inaugurated with the Motto of No one is left behind.

Its main aim was to provide a one stop stage for Students in Sri Lanka to meet with Higher Educational and Tertiary Educational Institutes (Government and Private) and make educated choices about their Career Development. There by aiding them to become part of a highly skilled National Workforce for Sri Lanka's Economic and Social development.

Students from universities in Australia, United Kingdom, USA, Japan, Malaysia, New Zealand, Russia, China and India too participate in the exhibition annually.

References

External link

Nalanda College Colombo
Annual events in Colombo
Exhibitions in Sri Lanka
Annual events in Galle
Annual events in Kandy